Michael Icely (born 12 May 1997) is an Australian rugby union player who plays for the  in Super Rugby. His playing position is flanker or number 8. He was named in the Rebels squad for Round 1 of the Super Rugby Trans-Tasman competition. He previously represented  in the 2019 National Rugby Championship.

Super Rugby statistics

Reference list

External links
itsrugby.co.uk profile

Australian rugby union players
Living people
1997 births
Rugby union flankers
Rugby union number eights
Melbourne Rebels players
New South Wales Country Eagles players
Rugby union players from Sydney
Australia international rugby sevens players